Nannilam taluk is a taluk in Thiruvarur district of the Indian state of Tamil Nadu. The headquarters of the taluk is the town of Nannilam.

Demographics
According to the 2011 census, the taluk of Nannilam had a population of 137,743 with 69,110  males and 68,633 females. There were 993 women for every 1000 men. The taluk had a literacy rate of 77.25. Child population in the age group below 6 was 6,600 Males and 6,276 Females.

References 

Taluks of Tiruvarur district